Wang Nan (born 22 April 1988) is a Chinese retired ice hockey player. She was a member of the Chinese women's national ice hockey team and represented China at the Asian Winter Games in 2007 and 2011, winning bronze at both events. She was on the entry list for the women's ice hockey tournament at the 2010 Winter Olympics but was not selected to the final Chinese roster and did not play.

References

External links
 
 

1988 births
Living people
Chinese women's ice hockey defencemen
Sportspeople from Harbin
Asian Games medalists in ice hockey
Ice hockey players at the 2007 Asian Winter Games
Ice hockey players at the 2011 Asian Winter Games
Medalists at the 2007 Asian Winter Games
Medalists at the 2011 Asian Winter Games
Asian Games bronze medalists for China